National Route 17 is a national highway in South Korea. It connects the city of Yeosu to the cities of Suncheon, Namwon, Jeonju, Daejeon, Cheongju, and Yongin.

This Road runs parallel to the Jeolla Line(전라선) and the Suncheon–Wanju Expressway, Jungbu Expressway.

History

Main stopovers 

 South Jeolla Province
 Yeosu - Suncheon - Gurye County - Suncheon - Gokseong County
 North Jeolla Province
 Namwon - Imsil County - Wanju County - Jeonju - Wonju County
 South Chungcheong Province
 Geumsan County 
 Daejeon
 Dong District - Jung District - Dong District - Daedeok District
 North Chungcheong Province
 Cheongju - Jincheon County
 Gyeonggi Province
 Anseong - Yongin

Major intersections

 (■): Motorway
IS: Intersection, IC: Interchange

South Jeolla Province 

  Motorway sections
 Yeosu Expo Tunnel ~ Jusam IC (Expo-daero)
 Yeosu Deogyang IS ~ Suncheon Sindae IS (Expo-daero)

North Jeolla Province 

  Motorway section
 Namwon Geumji IS ~ Bangja IS (Seobu-ro)

South Chungcheong Province

Daejeon

North Chungcheong Province

Gyeonggi Province

References

17
Roads in South Jeolla
Roads in North Jeolla
Roads in South Chungcheong
Roads in Daejeon
Roads in North Chungcheong
Roads in Gyeonggi